Cubophis fuscicauda, the  Cayman Brac racer, is a species of snake in the family Colubridae. The species is native to Cayman Brac.

References

Cubophis
Snakes of North America
Reptiles described in 1888
[[Category:Taxa named by Samuel Garman]